Bahmani (also Romanized as Bahmanī; also known as Bahmé, Bahmeh’ī, and Bahme’ī) is a village in Banesh Rural District, Beyza District, Sepidan County, Fars Province, Iran. At the 2006 census, its population was 167, in 35 families.

References 

Populated places in Beyza County